Palcrafts is a registered Scottish charity that aims to relieve poverty for Palestinian people by promoting their craft heritage and traditional skills through education and through its trading arm, Hadeel. Palcrafts was established in 2003 and is a limited by guarantee. It is located at 123 George Street, Edinburgh.

Hadeel has Fair Trade status to purchase, import and sell traditional crafts from producer groups, mainly women's cooperatives and people with special needs, providing social benefits through employment. The educational work aims to spread knowledge of the rich craft heritage of Palestine and the craft producers. All profits are used to make grants for further development of the producer groups.

In 2010, Hadeel received Edinburgh's Lord Provost's Fair Trade General Award.

References

Charities based in Scotland
Non-governmental organizations involved in the Israeli–Palestinian conflict
Poverty-related organizations
2003 establishments in Scotland
State of Palestine–United Kingdom relations